The 11th British Academy Video Games Awards ceremony, presented by the British Academy of Film and Television Arts (BAFTA), honored video games of 2014 and took place on 12 March 2015 at the Tobacco Dock in London, beginning at 7:00pm (GMT). During the ceremony, BAFTA presented awards in 16 categories. The ceremony, broadcast live on streaming website Twitch, was hosted by comedian Rufus Hound.

Monument Valley and The Last of Us: Left Behind won two awards each, while Destiny won the Best Game award. Other winners included Alien: Isolation, Far Cry 4, Hearthstone: Heroes of Warcraft, League of Legends, Lumino City, Minecraft, Never Alone, OlliOlli, The Vanishing of Ethan Carter and Valiant Hearts: The Great War.

Winners and nominees
The nominees for the 11th British Academy Video Games Awards were announced on 10 February 2015 at 10:30am (GMT). Alien: Isolation received the most nominations with six total; Far Cry 4 and Monument Valley tied for second with five nominations each, followed by 80 Days, Destiny, Mario Kart 8 and Middle-earth: Shadow of Mordor with four each.

The winners were announced during the awards ceremony on 12 March 2015. Destiny's win for Best Game was the fourth BAFTA win for developer Bungie, but their first outside of the Halo series. Ashley Johnson won the award for Performer for the second consecutive year for her portrayal of Ellie in The Last of Us: Left Behind.

Awards

Winners are shown first in bold.

BAFTA Fellowship Award
David Braben

BAFTA Ones to Watch Award
Chambara – Overly Kinetic

Games with multiple nominations and wins

Nominations

Wins

Presenters and performers
The following individuals presented awards or performed musical numbers.

Presenters (in order of appearance)

Performers
Riva Taylor was the only performer at the 11th British Academy Video Games Awards, performing "Earth to Earth", a song written specifically for the event, to open the ceremony.

Critical reviews
The ceremony received generally mixed to positive reception from media publications. Paul Tassi of American business magazine Forbes claimed that the British Academy Video Games Awards "might be [his] favorite show worldwide right now", praising the "sheer breadth and diversity of their award categories, and what they choose to honor". Tassi went on to praise winning games such as The Vanishing of Ethan Carter (Game Innovation) and League of Legends (Persistent Game). Oliver Cragg of newspaper The Independent welcomed the strong presence of "creative indie titles" at the ceremony. A review written by GameCentral for newspaper Metro, however, went as far as to state that "we’re not sure we agree with any of the awards, except for Alien Isolation and David Braben", criticising "nonsense" such as a win for Minecraft, which was originally released years previously.

The majority of negative reactions to the ceremony related to Destiny winning the BAFTA for Best Game. Adam Rosser of BBC Radio 5 Live explained that "There was an audible ripple of surprise in the press room as Destiny took the best game Bafta", noting that the game had been "criticised in many quarters for ... suffering from a sparsely populated game world and repetitive gameplay". Some commentators supported the result, however: GamesRadar+, who named Destiny their game of the year, claimed that "it's good to see Bungie's masterpiece getting the attention it deserves". Entertainment Weekly's Jonathon Dornbush concluded that "despite its flaws, Destiny has demonstrated why it’s tough to put the game down, and may be worth revisiting for those who initially wrote the game off", while Forbes writer Paul Tassi claimed that Dragon Age: Inquisition was arguably the "definitive" game of the year.

Arguably one of the most surprising results was in the Sports category, where independent title OlliOlli beat out many bigger releases such as FIFA 15. Matt Kamen of Wired described this as a "shocking win", and Mark Langshaw of Digital Spy similarly dubbed it "a shock".

References

External links
11th BAFTA Video Games Awards page

British Academy Games Awards ceremonies
2014 in video gaming
2015 awards in the United Kingdom
March 2015 events in the United Kingdom